The Imperial is the second studio album by American band The Delines. It was released on January 11, 2019 though Decor Records.

Track listing

Charts

References

2019 albums